The relationship between Pope Leo XIII and Russia was characterized by attempts by the Holy See to secure greater Church rights for Catholics in the Russian Empire.

Relationship with Alexander II
Leo XIII began his pontificate with a friendly letter to Tsar Alexander II, in which he reminded the Russian monarch of the millions of Catholics living in his empire, who would like to be good Russian subjects, provided their dignity is respected.

He appealed to the generosity of the Tsar, since Vatican-Russian relations were at a low point. The Tsar replied in an equally friendly manner and promised actions towards equal treatment of all Catholics in the empire. As during the pontificate of Pope Pius IX, this turned out to be relative,  since most problems were at the local level.

Russian language in Catholic Churches
As negotiations started, Russian demands for the use of Russian language in Catholic Churches including the Polish and Lithuanian provinces, was unacceptable to the Vatican. Pope Leo XIII threatened to appeal directly to all Catholics in Russia.

Vacant episcopal sees
Some progress was made in the occupation of vacant Episcopal sees, but an emotional breakthrough was the Papal encyclical from December 28, 1878, against nihilism and socialism and radicalism, which was dear to the Russian monarch, who was under constant pressure from nihilist and socialist forces. Repeated assassination attempts against Alexander II  gave the Pope opportunity to repeat his warnings, which were read in all Catholic Churches.

Coronation of Alexander III
After  the assassination of Alexander II, the Pope sent a high ranking representative to the coronation of his successor. Alexander III  was grateful and asked for all religious forces to unify. He asked the Pope to ensure that his bishops abstain from political agitation. Relations improved further, when Pope Leo XIII, due to Italian considerations, distanced the Vatican from the Rome, Vienna, Berlin alliance and helped to facilitate a rapprochement between Paris and St. Petersburg.

Status of Ruthenians and Poles
Meanwhile, the Ruthenians continued to be persecuted and Rome was not able to assist much. Russia began to protest against Church uses by Polish groups for anti-Russian activities, and the Pope found himself in the same dilemma as his predecessor Pius IX. He was personally attacked for sacrificing Polish interest in the language dispute. Russia in turn accused its Catholics of being disloyal citizens, without attacking the Pope himself.

Relationship with Nicholas II
After the elevation of Tsar Nicolas II in 1894, Pope Leo XIII was able to reach additional agreements in 1896, which resulted in better conditions for the faithful, numerous specific dispensations and permits,  and additional appointments of bishops. However, he was not able to reopen the nunciature in St. Petersburg.  His pontificate ended with atmospheric improvements between the Vatican and Russia. In 1899 Nicholas II and Queen Wilhelmina of the Netherlands used Pope Leo XIII's offices in their attempts to establish a peace conference of European nations.

Notes

References
 Acta Apostolicae Sedis ( AAS), Roma, Vaticano 1922-1960
 Acta et decreta Pii IX, Pontificis Maximi, VolI-VII, Romae 1854 ff
 Acta et decreta Leonis XIII, P.M. Vol I-XXII, Romae, 1881, ff
 Actae Sanctae Sedis, (ASS), Romae, Vaticano 1865
 L. Boudou, Le S. Siege et la Russie, Paris, 1890
 Owen Chadwick, The Christian Church in the Cold War, London 1993
 Handbuch der Kirchengeschichte, VII, Herder Freiburg, 1979, 355-380
 

Pope Leo XIII
Holy See–Russia relations
Russian Empire